Boon Lay is a neighbourhood located in the town of Jurong West in the West Region of Singapore. Its borders very roughly correspond to the URA subzone of Boon Lay Place, situated within the Jurong West Planning Area.

The subzone was named after Chew Boon Lay, a prominent businessman in the late 19th century and early 20th century who owned the land where the precinct stands. Boon Lay Place had earthworks begun in 1969 and had their HDB flats built since 1974.

The subzone is a division of West Coast GRC, under the management of West Coast Town Council. The people living there are represented by member of parliament Desmond Lee.

Neighbouring Areas

Residential Areas
The only private estate in the precinct is Summerdale, while the rest consists of estates built by the government.

those in italic are HDB's Built-To-Order(BTO) flats which are currently under construction.

Transportation

Roads
The main roads in the precinct are Jalan Boon Lay, Boon Lay Way, Corporation Road and Jurong West Avenue 2, which bounds the precinct and connects it to the rest of the island through linking with the PIE (exits 34 and 36), with minor roads (Boon Lay Avenue, Boon Lay Drive and Boon Lay Place) winding through the various estates in the precinct.

Public transport

Connection to MRT
The precinct is situated between Boon Lay and Lakeside stations. Connection to both stations is available through feeder bus services 240 and 246 and trunk bus services 30, 154, 157 and 180, depending on direction of travel.

Connection to other areas
Connection to Nanyang, Gek Poh Ville, Hong Kah, Yuhua, Joo Koon and Clementi is available through trunk bus service 99.
Connection to Pioneer, Hong Kah, Yuhua, NUH, One-North, Buona Vista, Tanglin Halt, Queenstown and Bukit Merah is available through trunk bus service 198.
Connection to Pioneer, Bukit Batok, Bukit Timah, Holland Village and the city is available through trunk bus service 174.
Direct connection to the city is available through express bus service 502.

Interstate bus services
In addition to local buses, Malaysian Inter-State Express Buses start off from the former Savoy cinema to specific destinations in Malaysia as an alternative to the bus terminals located downtown such as those at Kallang Bahru Bus Terminal and Golden Mile Shopping Centre. Tickets can be bought from ticket agents at Boon Lay Shopping Centre.

Schools
There is 1 primary school (Boon Lay Garden), 2 secondary schools (Boon Lay Secondary School and River Valley High) and many childcare centres in the precinct.

Other facilities
The town centre is located at Boon Lay Place and is where the residents of Boon Lay bond with each other while meeting their daily needs. It is accessible from all parts of the precinct through feeder bus service 240 and 246 and trunk bus service 99.

There are 2 churches (The Church of Saint Francis of Assisi and Jurong Church of Christ) and 1 Chinese temple known as Tuas Pek Kong Keng Temple (大士伯公宫) in the precinct and all of them are found in the town centre.

There is a Boon Lay Hawker at the town centre where local food can be found.

The precinct's community centre (Boon Lay Community Centre) is located at the junction of Boon Lay Place and Boon Lay Avenue, as part of the town centre. It was upgraded from 2010 to 2011.

Boon Lay Shopping Centre
Managed by HDB, this is the shopping centre that caters mainly to the residents of Boon Lay Place. An anchor tenant in this shopping centre is NTUC Fairprice. The shopping centre has been upgraded with new facilities likes elevators and escalators since late 2012.

References
Victor R Savage, Brenda S A Yeoh (2003), Toponymics – A Study of Singapore Street Names, Eastern Universities Press, 
Ong Chwee Im; Chew Kheng Chuan & Evelyn Chew. (2002). Chew Boon Lay: A Family Traces its History. Singapore: The Compiler.

External links
West Coast Town Council
Boon Lay Place @ sg.pagenation.com
URA – Planning Area Boundaries @ ura.gov.sg
NEA – List of Government Markets / Hawker Centres @ nea.gov.sg
SBS Transit- Upgrading of Boon Lay Bus Interchange
Boon Lay Constituency Website

 
West Region, Singapore
Places in Singapore
Jurong West